Kalle Christopher Jonathan Heino-Lindberg (born January 29, 1985, Helsingborg, Sweden) is a Swedish former professional ice hockey goaltender. In Elitserien, Heino-Lindberg has played in Färjestads BK and AIK.

He has played for the Swedish team during the Junior World Championships.

In his first season with Färjestads BK, 2005–06, he and the team won the Swedish Championship. Heino-Lindberg was drafted in the 2003 NHL Entry Draft by the Montreal Canadiens, in the 6th round as 177th pick overall.

Heino-Lindberg has also performed in the musicals Sound of Music and Mio min Mio, and played the role of Matti in the television series Eva och Adam. He was a member of the rap duo Chris & Gino, and in the 2010s he started his career as a country musician under the name Chris Lindberg.

Career statistics

Regular season

Playoffs

Qualification

Personal life 
Heino-Lindberg is of Finnish descent through his father who is actor . Heino-Lindberg's maternal aunt is singer Christina Lindberg, and his paternal grandfather Reino Heino was a competitive weightlifter at the international level.

References

External links

1985 births
AIK IF players
Färjestad BK players
Living people
Montreal Canadiens draft picks
Nybro Vikings players
Swedish ice hockey goaltenders
Sportspeople from Helsingborg
Hammarby Hockey (1921–2008) players
20th-century Swedish male actors
21st-century Swedish male actors
21st-century Swedish singers
Swedish country singers
Swedish male musical theatre actors
Swedish male television actors
Swedish people of Finnish descent
Swedish rappers
21st-century Swedish male singers